Nuno Miguel Mendes Cavaleiro (born 7 January 1976 in Lisbon) is a Portuguese retired footballer who played as a winger.

References

External links
https://www.zerozero.pt/player.php?id=169&search=1

1976 births
Living people
Portuguese footballers
Footballers from Lisbon
Association football wingers
Primeira Liga players
Liga Portugal 2 players
Segunda Divisão players
C.D. Olivais e Moscavide players
F.C. Famalicão players
S.C. Braga B players
S.C. Braga players
Moreirense F.C. players
C.F. Estrela da Amadora players
F.C. Vizela players
AD Oliveirense players
Hong Kong First Division League players
South China AA players
Portugal youth international footballers
Portuguese expatriate footballers
Expatriate footballers in Hong Kong
Portuguese expatriate sportspeople in Hong Kong